The Bournemouth Air Festival is an annual air show held along the coast at Bournemouth, in Dorset, England. It has featured aircraft from the Royal Air Force and the Royal Navy, as well as civil aviation displays. Since its formation in 2008, the festival claims to have entertained over ten million people.

The festival usually takes place in late August, over four days including dusk and night air displays with live music. It is organised by Bournemouth, Christchurch and Poole Council, and is estimated to generate about £30 million of trade annually for local businesses.

2011 crash 
A Red Arrows Hawk aircraft crashed into a field near Throop Mill, one mile from Bournemouth Airport following a display at the 2011 Bournemouth Air Festival. Flt Lt Jon Egging, pilot of Red 4 (XX179), died in the accident. The investigation into the incident determined that Flt Lt Egging was incapacitated due to the effects of g-force induced loss of consciousness until very shortly before impact. A memorial to Egging was originally unveiled in 2012 at East Cliff, Bournemouth, before being moved to a new location nearby in 2017 following a landslip. His widow Emma Egging was made an OBE in the 2021 Birthday Honours.

References

External links 

Official Bournemouth Air Festival Website
Bournemouth Air Festival Website
Official Bournemouth Air Festival Facebook
Official Bournemouth Air Festival Twitter
Official Bournemouth Air Festival Instagram

Airshows in the United Kingdom
Festivals in Dorset
Festivals established in 2008
2008 establishments in England
Annual events in England
Tourist attractions in Bournemouth